The second season of La Voz... Argentina premiered on October 1, 2018, on Telefe. Marley reprised his role as the host of the show, while actress Candelaria Molfese became the digital host.

Auditions for the show took place from May to July in the cities of Buenos Aires, Córdoba, Rosario, Mendoza, Mar del Plata, Salta and Corrientes. Unlike the previous season, online auditions were not accepted.

This was the second Latin American version in The Voice franchise, after the Mexican version, La Voz... México.

Coaches and presenters

As in the previous season, that took place in 2012, Marley became the host of the show. This season introduced actress and singer Candelaria Molfese as the digital host of the show. This is the second time that Marley hosts a singing competition, after hosting the Argentine version of Operación Triunfo, for 4 seasons.

There was a lot of speculation about the coaches for the new season. Returning coaches from the first season were the Latin pop singer Axel and folk singer Soledad Pastorutti. New coaches were confirmed to be pop singer Tini Stoessel and Venezuelan-Argentine singer and songwriter Ricardo Montaner.

Teams
Color key

Blind auditions
Color key

The Battles 

The Battle Rounds started on November 2. Season two's advisors include: Mau y Ricky for Team Montaner, Kany García for Team Sole, Cali y El Dandee for Team Tini, and  Becky G for Team Axel. Contestants who win their battle or are stolen by another coach will advance to the Knockout rounds.

Color key:

The Knockouts
The Knockouts round started on November 15. The coaches can each steal two losing artist from another team. Carlos Vives is the advisor to contestants from all teams in this round. After this round, each coach got the chance to bring an eliminated contestant back into the competition. The top 32 contestants then moved on to the Playoffs.

Color key:

The Playoffs
The Playoffs comprised episodes 37 to 40. The top thirty-two artists perform, with two artists from each team advancing based on their coach's own decision. The remaining contestants face the public vote and two other advance.

Color key:

Live shows
Color key:

Round 1: Top 16 (December 3–7)
This season, the live show voting mechanism has changed. Every night, a different team performs. At the end of each live show, voting lines get opened for 24 hours. At the beginning of the following night's live show, the results are announced and one artist is eliminated. At the end of every round, each coach will have one less artist in his/her team which means that every team will be represented by one artist in the final.

Quarterfinals: Top 12 (December 7, 10/12)
The 8 artists who survive this week will participate in a live concert that will take place in Teatro Gran Rex, on December 19.

In episode 46, Soledad could not attend the show. She was replaced by actress and singer Natalia Oreiro.

Semifinals: Top 8 (December 13 & 14)
In episode 50 Tini Stoessel could  not attend the show. She was replaced by Spanish singer Pablo Alborán. Also In episode 51, Axel could not attend the show. He was replaced by singer Geronimo Rauch.

Finale: Top 4 (December 16)

Elimination chart

Overall
Color key
Artist's info

Result details

Teams
Color key
Artist's info

Results details

References

Argentina
2012 Argentine television seasons